Philodoria hibiscella, the hibiscus leaf miner, is a moth of the family Gracillariidae. It was first described by Otto Swezey in 1913. It is endemic to the Hawaiian islands of Oahu and Hawaii.

The larvae feed on Hibiscus arnottianus and Hibiscus rosa-sinensis. They mine the leaves of their host plant. The mine starts towards the base of the leaf, proceeding upward irregularly and following the margin for a part of the course, eventually reaching the apex, then following down the opposite margin of the leaf and rapidly widening until the larva has finished its growth. Full-grown larvae are about 9 mm long and pale bluish green.

The larva breaks through the epidermis to form a white oval cocoon on the surface of the leaf. The pupa is 5 mm long and pale testaceous greenish. The pupal stage lasts about a week.

External links

Philodoria
Leaf miners
Endemic moths of Hawaii